The Australian Corrections Medal (ACM) is a civil decoration awarded to Australian correctional service members for distinguished service. The ACM was introduced on 19 June 2017. Recipients of the Australian Corrections Medal are entitled to use the post-nominal letters "ACM".

Awards are made by the Governor-General, on the nomination of the responsible minister in each state or territory, and at the federal level.  The total number of awards made each year must not exceed the following quota:
 One medal for every 1000 full-time members, or 1000 part-time members of a state or territory correctional service.

Description
The medal is a circular nickel-silver medal. The obverse features the Federation Star bearing the scales of justice surrounded by a wreath of Australian wattle. The reverse of the medal is inscribed with the recipient's name surrounded by another wreath of Australian wattle. The suspension bar has 'Corrections' written on the obverse side only with the back remaining blank.

See also
 Australian Honours Order of Precedence

References

Establishing Gazette
Department of the Prime Minister and Cabinet

Civil awards and decorations of Australia
2017 establishments in Australia
Awards established in 2017
Long and Meritorious Service Medals of Britain and the Commonwealth
Penal system in Australia
Prison officer awards